George Spillman (24 October 1856 – 18 April 1911) was an English first-class cricketer active 1877–86 who played for Middlesex. He was born in London; died in Brighton.

References

1856 births
1911 deaths
English cricketers
Middlesex cricketers
North v South cricketers